Timarni Assembly constituency is one of the 230 Vidhan Sabha (Legislative Assembly) constituencies of Madhya Pradesh state in central India.

It is part of Harda District.

Member of Legislative Assembly

See also
 Timarni

References

Assembly constituencies of Madhya Pradesh